Eko Yuli Irawan (born 24 July 1989) is an Indonesian weightlifter, Olympian, and World Champion competing in the 62 kg category until 2018 and 61 kg starting in 2018 after the International Weightlifting Federation reorganized the categories.

Irawan started his career at the 2006 World Junior Championships, when he won a silver medal. Since then, he has continued his brilliant career by achieving many achievements.

In his career he has won four medals at the Summer Olympics, five medals at world championships, and three medals at the Asian Games, including a gold in 2018. He is one of only 5 weightlifting athletes who has won 4 Olympic medals.

Career

Irawan's father worked as a paddle rickshaw driver, while his mother was selling vegetables. Irawan took up weightlifting in 2000. At the 2006 Junior World Championships he won the silver medal in the 56 kg category, lifting 269 kg in total.
At the 2007 Junior World Championships he won the gold medal in the 56 kg category, lifting 273 kg in total.

Irawan ranked eighth at the 2006 World Championships in the 56 kg category. At the 2007 World Championships he won the bronze medal in the 56 kg category, lifting 278 kg in total.

Irawan won gold medals at the 2007 Southeast Asian Games and 2018 Asian Games.

At the 2008 Asian Championships he won the silver medal in the 62 kg category, lifting 305 kg in total.

Irawan won the bronze medal in the 56 kg category at the 2008 Summer Olympics in Beijing, lifting 288 kg in total. He won the silver medal in the 62 kg category at the 2009 World Weightlifting Championships, with 315 kg in total. At the 2011 World Championships he won the bronze medal in the 62 kg category, lifting 310 kg in total.

Irawan won his second consecutive Olympic bronze medal in 2012, lifting 317 kg in total. He improved to a silver medal at the 2016 Rio Olympics. He also become world champion in newly created 61 kg category in world weightlifting championship 2018 in Ashgbat, Turkmenistan, also world record holder in clean & jerk at 174 kg and world record holder in total lift at 317 kg in that category.

He represented Indonesia at the 2020 Summer Olympics in Tokyo, Japan. He won the silver in the men's 61 kg event at the 2020 Summer Olympics in Tokyo, Japan.

Awards and nominations

Others:

By the Republic of Indonesia:

 2009 - Satyalancana Wira Karya

By the province of East Java:

 2021 - Jer Basuki Mawa Beya Golden Badge

Major results

References

External links
 
 

People from Metro (city)
Weightlifters at the 2008 Summer Olympics
Weightlifters at the 2012 Summer Olympics
Weightlifters at the 2016 Summer Olympics
Weightlifters at the 2020 Summer Olympics
Living people
World Weightlifting Championships medalists
Indonesian male weightlifters
Olympic weightlifters of Indonesia
Olympic bronze medalists for Indonesia
Olympic silver medalists for Indonesia
Olympic medalists in weightlifting
Asian Games medalists in weightlifting
Asian Games gold medalists for Indonesia
Asian Games bronze medalists for Indonesia
Weightlifters at the 2006 Asian Games
Weightlifters at the 2010 Asian Games
Weightlifters at the 2014 Asian Games
Weightlifters at the 2018 Asian Games
Medalists at the 2020 Summer Olympics
Medalists at the 2016 Summer Olympics
Medalists at the 2012 Summer Olympics
Medalists at the 2008 Summer Olympics
1989 births
Medalists at the 2010 Asian Games
Medalists at the 2014 Asian Games
Medalists at the 2018 Asian Games
Universiade medalists in weightlifting
Sportspeople from Lampung
Southeast Asian Games gold medalists for Indonesia
Southeast Asian Games silver medalists for Indonesia
Southeast Asian Games medalists in weightlifting
Competitors at the 2007 Southeast Asian Games
Competitors at the 2009 Southeast Asian Games
Competitors at the 2011 Southeast Asian Games
Competitors at the 2013 Southeast Asian Games
Competitors at the 2017 Southeast Asian Games
Universiade gold medalists for Indonesia
Competitors at the 2019 Southeast Asian Games
Medalists at the 2011 Summer Universiade
Islamic Solidarity Games medalists in weightlifting
Islamic Solidarity Games competitors for Indonesia
Competitors at the 2021 Southeast Asian Games
20th-century Indonesian people
21st-century Indonesian people